North Carolina's 48th Senate district is one of 50 districts in the North Carolina Senate. It has been represented by Republican Tim Moffitt since 2023.

Geography
Since 2023, the district has covered all of Henderson counties, Polk, and Rutherford counties. The district overlaps with the 111th, 113th, and 117th state house districts.

District officeholders since 2003

Election results

2022

2020

2018

2016

2014

2012

2010

2008

2006

2004

2002

References

North Carolina Senate districts
Henderson County, North Carolina
Polk County, North Carolina
Rutherford County, North Carolina